Bednarik is a name and may refer to:

People
Chuck Bednarik, a former professional American football player
Ignat Bednarik, a Romanian painter 
Miloslav Bednařík, a shooter who represented Czechoslovakia at the 1988 Summer Olympics in Seoul
Robert G. Bednarik, an Australian archeologist
Sebastián Bednarik, a Uruguayan film director

Other
Chuck Bednarik Award, an award presented annually to the defensive collegiate football player adjudged by the Maxwell Football Club